Rowmari is a village in Kamrup rural district, in the state of Assam, India, situated on the north bank of river Brahmaputra.

Transport
The village is near National Highway 31 and connected to nearby towns and cities with regular buses and other modes of transportation.

See also
 Rangmahal
 Rani

References

Villages in Kamrup district